Tai Wo Tsuen or Tai Wo Village is a village in Tai Po District, Hong Kong.

Administration
Tai Wo Tsuen is a recognized village under the New Territories Small House Policy. It is one of the villages represented within the Tai Po Rural Committee. For electoral purposes, Tai Wo Tsuen is part of the Hong Lok Yuen constituency, which was formerly represented by Zero Yiu Yeuk-sang until May 2021.

References

External links

 Delineation of area of existing village Tai Wo (Tai Po) for election of resident representative (2019 to 2022)

Villages in Tai Po District, Hong Kong